The 2016 Boston College Eagles football team represented Boston College as a member of the Atlantic Division of the Atlantic Coast Conference (ACC) in the 2016 NCAA Division I FBS football season. The Eagles were led by fourth-year head coach Steve Addazio and played their home games at Alumni Stadium. They finished the season 7–6 overall and 2–6 in ACC play to tie for sixth place in the Atlantic Division. They were invited to the Quick Lane Bowl, where they defeated Maryland.

Background

Previous season
The 2015 Boston College Eagles football team finished the season 3–9 overall and 0–8 in Atlantic Coast Conference play.  That season was marked by numerous injuries and inexperience at key positions but the result was nonetheless seen as major setback in Steve Addazio’s rebuild of the program, shaking the confidence of many in the Boston College athletics community.

Off-season coaching changes
The one clear bright spot of the 2015 Boston College Eagles football team was the defense under third-year defensive coordinator Don Brown, under whose stewardship the Eagles led the nation in total defense and were top #10 in numerous other defensive categories.  But on December 21, 2015 Jim Harbaugh hired away Brown to coach the same position for the Michigan Wolverines.  On the other side of the ball offensive coordinator Todd Fitch, under whom the Eagles finished 126th in total offense and 122nd in scoring offense, was not retained by Steve Addazio.

Addazio turned to Iowa linebackers coach and former Eagles defensive coordinator under Dan Henning, Jim Reid, to take over for Brown as defensive coordinator.  Addazio hired former Syracuse head coach Paul Pasqualoni as defensive line coach.  Pasqualoni had coached on the defensive side of the ball in the NFL for the previous few years.

On the offensive side of the ball Addazio hired former Virginia Tech offensive coordinator Scot Loeffler to take over the same position for the Eagles, replacing Fitch.

Off-season player losses
The defense lost three key contributors from the dominant 2015 team, with the graduation of Steven Daniels, Justin Simmons and Connor Wujciak.  The offense lost fullback and tight end Louis Addazio.

Off-season player additions
Former Kentucky Wildcat starting quarterback, Patrick Towles transferred to Boston College as a graduate student, to compete with former sophomore starter Darius Wade, whose 2015 season was cut short by injury. Jimmy Lowery, a 4 year starting right tackle at Eastern Illinois transferred to Boston College as a graduate student. Lowery started all 13 games for Boston College at right tackle. Lowery was one of 4 Boston College football players to attain ACC All Academic status graduating in May 2017 with a master's degree in Finance.

2016 recruiting class
Coming off a disappointing 2015 football season, Steve Addazio and the Eagles managed the 74th ranked recruiting class in the nation, ranked last in the ACC by the recruiting services.

Preseason expectations
The 2016 Boston College Eagles football team entered the season with no votes in the Preseason AP Top 25 Poll.  During the ACC Media Days, the ACC Sportswriters predicted Boston College to finish fifth in the Atlantic Division.  College Football News predicted a 6–6 (2–6) season, good for sixth place finish in the Atlantic Division.  Athlon Sports likewise predicted the Eagles to finish sixth in the Atlantic.  ESPN's Football Power Index (FPI) predicted Boston College to finish with 5.7–6.3 wins.

Personnel

Coaching staff

Schedule

Game summaries

vs. Georgia Tech

at Massachusetts

at Virginia Tech

Wagner

Buffalo

Clemson

Syracuse

at NC State

Louisville

at Florida State

UConn

at Wake Forest

Maryland–Quick Lane Bowl

2017 NFL draft 
Main article:2017 NFL Draft

References

Boston College
Boston College Eagles football seasons
Quick Lane Bowl champion seasons
Boston College Eagles football
Boston College Eagles football